Júnior Santos may refer to:

 Junior dos Santos (born 1984), Brazilian mixed martial artist
 Júnior Santos (footballer, born 1985), Natanael de Sousa Santos Júnior, Brazilian football attacking midfielder
 Júnior Santos (footballer, born 1994), José Antonio dos Santos Júnior, Brazilian football forward